The 1987 Nice International Open was a men's tennis tournament played on outdoor clay courts at the Nice Lawn Tennis Club in Nice, France, and was part of the 1987 Nabisco Grand Prix. It was the 16th edition of the tournament and was held from 13 April through 19 April 1987. First-seeded Kent Carlsson won the singles title.

Finals

Singles
 Kent Carlsson defeated  Emilio Sánchez 7–6, 6–3
 It was Carlsson's 1st singles title of the year and the 3rd of his career.

Doubles
 Sergio Casal /  Emilio Sánchez defeated  Claudio Mezzadri /  Gianni Ocleppo 6–3, 6–3

References

External links
 ITF tournament edition details

Nice International Open
1987
Nice International Open
Nice International Open
20th century in Nice